A soccer robot is a specialized autonomous robot and mobile robot that is used to play variants of soccer.

The main organised competitions are RoboCup or FIRA tournaments played each year.

The RoboCup contest currently has a number of soccer leagues:
 Standard Platform League (formerly Four Legged League)
 Small Size League
 Middle Size League
 Simulation League
 2D Soccer Simulation
 3D Soccer Simulation
 Humanoid League

Additionally, there is a RoboCupJunior league for younger students.

qfix Soccer robot 

The qfix soccer robot "Terminator" is an omnidrive robot that can be used for RoboCup Junior. It includes a kicker and a dribbler as well as a controller board with Atmel controller.

The robot can be programmed using the GNU GCC compiler.

Graupner RC-SOCCERBOT 
The Graupner "RC-SOCCERBOT" is a mobile robot platform developed by qfix which can be used as a radio-controller toy playing soccer with ping-pong balls. Gaining more experience in robotics the user can also implement C++ programs on the robot.

References

External links
 Official Website For RoboCup Junior
 qFix 
 Graupner Robotics
 Supplier of FIRA Robot Football/Robot Soccer solutions

Educational toys